Emmelina monodactyla (T-moth or morning-glory plume moth) is a moth of the family Pterophoridae. It is found in Europe, Japan, central Asia, North Africa and North America.

Description
The wingspan is 18–27 mm. The moths fly nearly year-round.
The moths are pale russet in colour, with a wingspan of 18–27 millimeters. The colouration is extremely variable, ranging from off-white with indistinct markings to a strong rust brown. The markings may vary considerably in size. The second and third segments are elongate. The caterpillars are greenish-yellow with a broad green band on the back, and a narrow broken yellow line running down the center. Some specimens may also have a wine-red marking on the back. The colour of the pupae may range from green to reddish brown, sometimes with black markings..

Biology
The larvae mainly feed on Convolvulaceae species, including Calystegia sepium, Calystegia spithamaea, Calystegia soldanella, Convolvulus arvensis, Convolvulus cantabrica, Convolvulus floridus, Convolvulus prostratus, Convolvulus tricolor, Ipomoea batatas, Ipomoea eriocarpa and Ipomoea purpurea, and also Atriplex (including Atriplex patula) and Chenopodium (including Chenopodium album) from the family Amaranthaceae, Cynara cardunculus from the family Asteraceae, and Datura stramonium and Hyoscyamus niger from the family Solanaceae.

References

External links
 waarneming.nl 
 Lepidoptera of Belgium

Oidaematophorini
Moths described in 1758
Moths of Iceland
Moths of North America
Plume moths of Africa
Plume moths of Asia
Plume moths of Europe
Taxa named by Carl Linnaeus